Organ transplantation is a medical procedure in which an organ is removed from one body and placed in the body of a recipient, to replace a damaged or missing organ.  The donor and recipient may be at the same location, or organs may be transported from a donor site to another location. Organs and/or tissues that are transplanted within the same person's body are called autografts. Transplants that are recently performed between two subjects of the same species are called allografts. Allografts can either be from a living or cadaveric source.

Organs that have been successfully transplanted include the heart, kidneys, liver, lungs, pancreas, intestine, thymus and uterus. Tissues include bones, tendons (both referred to as musculoskeletal grafts), corneae, skin, heart valves, nerves and veins.  Worldwide, the kidneys are the most commonly transplanted organs, followed by the liver and then the heart. Corneae and musculoskeletal grafts are the most commonly transplanted tissues; these outnumber organ transplants by more than tenfold.

Organ donors may be living, brain dead, or dead via circulatory death. Tissue may be recovered from donors who die of circulatory death, as well as of brain death – up to 24 hours past the cessation of heartbeat. Unlike organs, most tissues (with the exception of corneas) can be preserved and stored for up to five years, meaning they can be "banked". Transplantation raises a number of bioethical issues, including the definition of death, when and how consent should be given for an organ to be transplanted, and payment for organs for transplantation. Other ethical issues include transplantation tourism (medical tourism) and more broadly the socio-economic context in which organ procurement or transplantation may occur. A particular problem is organ trafficking. There is also the ethical issue of not holding out false hope to patients.

Transplantation medicine is one of the most challenging and complex areas of modern medicine. Some of the key areas for medical management are the problems of transplant rejection, during which the body has an immune response to the transplanted organ, possibly leading to transplant failure and the need to immediately remove the organ from the recipient. When possible, transplant rejection can be reduced through serotyping to determine the most appropriate donor-recipient match and through the use of immunosuppressant drugs.

Types of transplant

Autograft 

Autografts are the transplant of tissue to the same person. Sometimes this is done with surplus tissue, tissue that can regenerate, or tissues more desperately needed elsewhere (examples include skin grafts, vein extraction for CABG, etc.). Sometimes an autograft is done to remove the tissue and then treat it or the person before returning it (examples include stem cell autograft and storing blood in advance of surgery). In a rotationplasty, a distal joint is used to replace a more proximal one; typically a foot or ankle joint is used to replace a knee joint.  The person's foot is severed and reversed, the knee removed, and the tibia joined with the femur.

Allograft and allotransplantation 

An allograft is a transplant of an organ or tissue between two genetically non-identical members of the same species. Most human tissue and organ transplants are allografts. Due to the genetic difference between the organ and the recipient, the recipient's immune system will identify the organ as foreign and attempt to destroy it, causing transplant rejection. The risk of transplant rejection can be estimated by measuring the panel-reactive antibody level.

Isograft 
An isograft is a subset of allograft in which organs or tissues are transplanted from a donor to a genetically identical recipient (such as an identical twin). Isografts are differentiated from other types of transplants because while they are anatomically identical to autografts, they do not trigger an immune response.

Xenograft and xenotransplantation 

A xenograft is a transplant of organs or tissue from one species to another. An example is porcine heart valve transplant, which is quite common and successful. Another example is attempted piscine–primate (fish to non-human primate) transplant of pancreatic islets. The latter research study was intended to pave the way for potential human use if successful. However, xenotransplantion is often an extremely dangerous type of transplant because of the increased risk of non-functional compatibility, rejection, and disease carried in the tissue. In the opposite direction, attempts are being made devise a way to transplant human fetal hearts and kidneys into animals for future transplantation into human patients to address the shortage of donor organs.

Domino transplants 
In people with cystic fibrosis (CF), where both lungs need to be replaced, it is a technically easier operation with a higher rate of success to replace both the heart and lungs of the recipient with those of the donor. As the recipient's original heart is usually healthy, it can then be transplanted into a second recipient in need of a heart transplant, thus making the person with CF a living heart donor. In a 2016 case at Stanford Medical Center, a woman who was needing a heart-lung transplant had cystic fibrosis which had led to one lung expanding and the other shrinking, thereby displacing her heart.  The second patient who in turn received her heart was a woman with right ventricular dysplasia which had led to a dangerously abnormal rhythm.  The dual operations required three surgical teams, including one to remove the heart and lungs from a recently deceased initial donor.  The two living recipients did well and had an opportunity to meet six weeks after their simultaneous operations.

Another example of this situation occurs with a special form of liver transplant in which the recipient has familial amyloidotic polyneuropathy, a disease where the liver slowly produces a protein that damages other organs. The recipient's liver can then be transplanted into an older person for whom the effects of the disease will not necessarily contribute significantly to mortality.

This term also refers to a series of living donor transplants in which one donor donates to the highest recipient on the waiting list and the transplant center utilizes that donation to facilitate multiple transplants. These other transplants are otherwise impossible due to blood type or antibody barriers to transplantation. The "Good Samaritan" kidney is transplanted into one of the other recipients, whose donor in turn donates his or her kidney to an unrelated recipient. This method allows all organ recipients to get a transplant even if their living donor is not a match to them. This further benefits people below any of these recipients on waiting lists, as they move closer to the top of the list for a deceased-donor organ. Johns Hopkins Medical Center in Baltimore and Northwestern University's Northwestern Memorial Hospital have received significant attention for pioneering transplants of this kind. In February 2012, the last link in a record 60-person domino chain of 30 kidney transplants was completed.

ABO-incompatible transplants 

Because very young children (generally under 12 months, but often as old as 24 months) do not have a well-developed immune system, it is possible for them to receive organs from otherwise incompatible donors. This is known as ABO-incompatible (ABOi) transplantation. Graft survival and people's mortality is approximately the same between ABOi and ABO-compatible (ABOc) recipients. While focus has been on infant heart transplants, the principles generally apply to other forms of solid organ transplantation.

The most important factors are that the recipient not have produced isohemagglutinins, and that they have low levels of T cell-independent antigens. United Network for Organ Sharing (UNOS) regulations allow for ABOi transplantation in children under two years of age if isohemagglutinin titers are 1:4 or below, and if there is no matching ABOc recipient. Studies have shown that the period under which a recipient may undergo ABOi transplantation may be prolonged by exposure to nonself A and B antigens. Furthermore, should the recipient (for example, type B-positive with a type AB-positive graft) require eventual retransplantation, the recipient may receive a new organ of either blood type.

Limited success has been achieved in ABO-incompatible heart transplants in adults, though this requires that the adult recipients have low levels of anti-A or anti-B antibodies. Renal transplantation is more successful, with similar long-term graft survival rates to ABOc transplants.

Transplantation in obese individuals 

Until recently, people with obesity were not considered appropriate candidate donors for renal transplantation. In 2009, the physicians at the University of Illinois Medical Center performed the first robotic renal transplantation in an obese recipient and have continued to transplant people with a body mass index over 35 using robotic surgery. As of January 2014, over 100 people who would otherwise have been turned down because of their weight have successfully been transplanted.

Organs and tissues transplanted

Chest 
 Heart (deceased-donor only; porcine xenograft attempted)
 Lung (deceased-donor and living-related lung transplantation)
 Thymus

Abdomen
 Kidney (deceased-donor and living-donor; porcine xenograft attempted)
 Liver (deceased-donor, which enables donation of a whole liver; and living-donor, where each donor can provide up to 70% of a liver)
 Pancreas (deceased-donor only; a very severe type of diabetes ensues if a live person's entire pancreas is removed)
 Intestine (deceased-donor and living-donor; normally refers to the small intestine)
 Stomach (deceased-donor only)
 Uterus (deceased-donor only)
 Testis (deceased-donor and living-donor)
 Penis (deceased-donor only)

Tissues, cells and fluids 
 Hand (deceased-donor only), see first recipient Clint Hallam
 Cornea (deceased-donor only) see the ophthalmologist Eduard Zirm
 Skin, including face replant (autograft) and face transplant (extremely rare)
 Islets of Langerhans (pancreas islet cells) (deceased-donor and living-donor)
 Bone marrow or adult stem cell (living-donor and autograft)
 Blood transfusion, whole blood or fractionated blood products (living-donor and autograft)
 Blood vessels (autograft and deceased-donor)
 Heart valve (deceased-donor, living-donor and xenograft [porcine/bovine])
 Bone (deceased-donor and living-donor)

Types of donor 
Organ donors may be living or may have died of brain death or circulatory death. Most deceased donors are those who have been pronounced brain dead. Brain dead means the cessation of brain function, typically after receiving an injury (either traumatic or pathological) to the brain, or otherwise cutting off blood circulation to the brain (drowning, suffocation, etc.). Breathing is maintained via artificial sources, which, in turn, maintains heartbeat. Once brain death has been declared, the person can be considered for organ donation. Criteria for brain death vary. Because less than 3% of all deaths in the US are the result of brain death, the overwhelming majority of deaths are ineligible for organ donation, resulting in severe shortages.

Organ donation is possible after cardiac death in some situations, primarily when the person is severely brain-injured and not expected to survive without artificial breathing and mechanical support.  Independent of any decision to donate, a person's next-of-kin may decide to end artificial support. If the person is expected to expire within a short period of time after support is withdrawn, arrangements can be made to withdraw that support in an operating room to allow quick recovery of the organs after circulatory death has occurred.

Tissues may be recovered from donors who die of either brain or circulatory death. In general, tissues may be recovered from donors up to 24 hours past the cessation of heartbeat. In contrast to organs, most tissues (with the exception of corneas) can be preserved and stored for up to five years, meaning they can be "banked." Also, more than 60 grafts may be obtained from a single tissue donor. Because of these three factorsthe ability to recover from a non-heart-beating donor, the ability to bank tissue, and the number of grafts available from each donortissue transplants are much more common than organ transplants. The American Association of Tissue Banks estimates that more than one million tissue transplants take place in the United States each year.

Living donor 
In living donors, the donor remains alive and donates a renewable tissue, cell, or fluid (e.g., blood, skin), or donates an organ or part of an organ in which the remaining organ can regenerate or take on the workload of the rest of the organ (primarily single kidney donation, partial donation of liver, lung lobe, small bowel). Regenerative medicine may one day allow for laboratory-grown organs, using person's own cells via stem cells, or healthy cells extracted from the failing organs.

Deceased donor 
Deceased donors (formerly cadaveric) are people who have been declared brain-dead and whose organs are kept viable by ventilators or other mechanical mechanisms until they can be excised for transplantation. Apart from brainstem-dead donors, who have formed the majority of deceased donors for the last 20 years, there is increasing use of after-circulatory-death donors (formerly non-heart-beating donors) to increase the potential pool of donors as demand for transplants continues to grow. Prior to the legal recognition of brain death in the 1980s, all deceased organ donors had died of circulatory death.  These organs have inferior outcomes to organs from a brain-dead donor. For instance, patients who underwent liver transplantation using donation-after-circulatory-death allografts have been shown to have significantly lower graft survival than those from donation-after-brain-death allografts due to biliary complications and primary nonfunction in liver transplantation. However, given the scarcity of suitable organs and the number of people who die waiting, any potentially suitable organ must be considered.  Jurisdictions with medically assisted suicide may co-ordinate organ donations from that source.

Allocation of organs 

In most countries there is a shortage of suitable organs for transplantation. Countries often have formal systems in place to manage the process of determining who is an organ donor and in what order organ recipients receive available organs.

The overwhelming majority of deceased-donor organs in the United States are allocated by federal contract to the Organ Procurement and Transplantation Network, held since it was created by the Organ Transplant Act of 1984 by the United Network for Organ Sharing, or UNOS. (UNOS does not handle donor cornea tissue; corneal donor tissue is usually handled by various eye banks.) Individual regional organ procurement organizations, all members of the Organ Procurement and Transplantation Network, are responsible for the identification of suitable donors and collection of the donated organs.  UNOS then allocates organs based on the method considered most fair by the leadership in the field. The allocation methodology varies somewhat by organ, and changes periodically.  For example, liver allocation is based partially on MELD score (Model of End-Stage Liver Disease), an empirical score based on lab values indicative of the sickness of the person from liver disease. In 1984, the National Organ Transplant Act (NOTA) was passed; it gave way to the Organ Procurement and Transplantation Network, which maintains the organ registry and ensures equitable allocation of organs.  The Scientific Registry of Transplant Recipients was also established to conduct ongoing studies into the evaluation and clinical status of organ transplants.  In 2000 the Children's Health Act passed and required NOTA to consider special issues around pediatric patients and organ allocation.

An example of "line jumping" occurred in 2003 at Duke University when doctors attempted to correct an initially incorrect transplant.  An American teenager received a heart-lung donation with the wrong blood type for her.  She then received a second transplant even though she was then in such poor physical shape that she normally would not be considered a good candidate for a transplant.

In an April 2008 article in The Guardian, Steven Tsui, the head of the transplant team at Papworth Hospital in the UK, is quoted in raising the ethical issue of not holding out false hope.  He stated, "Conventionally we would say if people's life expectancy was a year or less we would consider them a candidate for a heart transplant. But we also have to manage expectations. If we know that in an average year we will do 30 heart transplants, there is no point putting 60 people on our waiting list, because we know half of them will die and it's not right to give them false hope."

Experiencing somewhat increased popularity, but still very rare, is directed or targeted donation, in which the family of a deceased donor (often honoring the wishes of the deceased) requests an organ be given to a specific person, subverting the allocation system. In the United States, there are various lengths of waiting times due to the different availabilities of organs in different UNOS regions. In other countries such as the UK, only medical factors and the position on the waiting list can affect who receives the organ.

One of the more publicized cases of this type was the 1994 Chester and Patti Szuber transplant.  This was the first time that a parent had received a heart donated by one of their own children.  Although the decision to accept the heart from his recently killed child was not an easy decision, the Szuber family agreed that giving Patti's heart to her father would have been something that she would have wanted.

Access to organ transplantation is one reason for the growth of medical tourism.

Reasons for donation and ethical issues

Living related donors 
Living related donors donate to family members or friends in whom they have an emotional investment. The risk of surgery is offset by the psychological benefit of not losing someone related to them, or not seeing them suffer the ill effects of waiting on a list.

Paired exchange 

A "paired-exchange" is a technique of matching willing living donors to compatible recipients using serotyping. For example, a spouse may be willing to donate a kidney to their partner but cannot since there is not a biological match. The willing spouse's kidney is donated to a matching recipient who also has an incompatible but willing spouse. The second donor must match the first recipient to complete the pair exchange. Typically the surgeries are scheduled simultaneously in case one of the donors decides to back out and the couples are kept anonymous from each other until after the transplant. Paired-donor exchange, led by work in the New England Program for Kidney Exchange as well as at Johns Hopkins University and the Ohio organ procurement organizations, may more efficiently allocate organs and lead to more transplants.

Paired exchange programs were popularized in the New England Journal of Medicine article "Ethics of a paired-kidney-exchange program" in 1997 by L.F. Ross. It was also proposed by Felix T. Rapport in 1986 as part of his initial proposals for live-donor transplants "The case for a living emotionally related international kidney donor exchange registry" in Transplant Proceedings. A paired exchange is the simplest case of a much larger exchange registry program where willing donors are matched with any number of compatible recipients. Transplant exchange programs have been suggested as early as 1970: "A cooperative kidney typing and exchange program."

The first pair exchange transplant in the US was in 2001 at Johns Hopkins Hospital. The first complex multihospital kidney exchange involving 12 people was performed in February 2009 by The Johns Hopkins Hospital, Barnes-Jewish Hospital in St. Louis and Integris Baptist Medical Center in Oklahoma City. Another 12-person multihospital kidney exchange was performed four weeks later by Saint Barnabas Medical Center in Livingston, New Jersey, Newark Beth Israel Medical Center and New York-Presbyterian Hospital. Surgical teams led by Johns Hopkins continue to pioneer this field with more complex chains of exchange, such as an eight-way multihospital kidney exchange. In December 2009, a 13 organ 13 recipient matched kidney exchange took place, coordinated through Georgetown University Hospital and Washington Hospital Center, Washington, DC.

Good Samaritan 
Good Samaritan or "altruistic" donation is giving a donation to someone that has no prior affiliation with the donor. The idea of altruistic donation is to give with no interest of personal gain, it is out of pure selflessness. On the other hand, the current allocation system does not assess a donor's motive, so altruistic donation is not a requirement. Some people choose to do this out of a personal need to donate. Some donate to the next person on the list; others use some method of choosing a recipient based on criteria important to them. Web sites are being developed that facilitate such donation. Over half of the members of the Jesus Christians, an Australian religious group, have donated kidneys in such a fashion.

Financial compensation 

Monetary compensation for organ donors, in the form of reimbursement for out-of-pocket expenses, has been legalised in Australia, and strictly only in the case of kidney transplant in the case of Singapore (minimal reimbursement is offered in the case of other forms of organ harvesting by Singapore). Kidney disease organizations in both countries have expressed their support.

In compensated donation, donors get money or other compensation in exchange for their organs. This practice is common in some parts of the world, whether legal or not, and is one of the many factors driving medical tourism.

In the illegal black market the donors may not get sufficient after-operation care, the price of a kidney may be above $160,000, middlemen take most of the money, the operation is more dangerous to both the donor and receiver, and the receiver often gets hepatitis or HIV. In legal markets of Iran the price of a kidney is $2,000 to $4,000.

An article by Gary Becker and Julio Elias on "Introducing Incentives in the market for Live and Cadaveric Organ Donations" said that a free market could help solve the problem of a scarcity in organ transplants. Their economic modeling was able to estimate the price tag for human kidneys ($15,000) and human livers ($32,000).

In the United States, The National Organ Transplant Act of 1984 made organ sales illegal. In the United Kingdom, the Human Organ Transplants Act 1989 first made organ sales illegal, and has been superseded by the Human Tissue Act 2004.  In 2007, two major European conferences recommended against the sale of organs. Recent development of web sites and personal advertisements for organs among listed candidates has raised the stakes when it comes to the selling of organs, and have also sparked significant ethical debates over directed donation, "good-Samaritan" donation, and the current US organ allocation policy. Bioethicist Jacob M. Appel has argued that organ solicitation on billboards and the internet may actually increase the overall supply of organs.

In an experimental survey, Elias, Lacetera and Macis (2019) find that preferences for compensation for kidney donors have strong moral foundations; participants in the experiment especially reject direct payments by patients, which they find would violate principles of fairness.

Many countries have different approaches to organ donation such as: the opt-out approach and many advertisements of organ donors, encouraging people to donate. Although these laws have been implemented into a certain country they are not forced upon very one as it is an individual decision.

Two books, Kidney for Sale By Owner by Mark Cherry (Georgetown University Press, 2005) and Stakes and Kidneys: Why Markets in Human Body Parts are Morally Imperative by James Stacey Taylor:
(Ashgate Press, 2005), advocate using markets to increase the supply of organs available for transplantation.
In a 2004 journal article economist Alex Tabarrok argues that allowing organ sales, and elimination of organ donor lists will increase supply, lower costs and diminish social anxiety towards organ markets.

Iran has had a legal market for kidneys since 1988. The donor is paid approximately US$1200 by the government and also usually receives additional funds from either the recipient or local charities. The Economist and the Ayn Rand Institute approve and advocate a legal market elsewhere. They argued that if 0.06% of Americans between 19 and 65 were to sell one kidney, the national waiting list would disappear (which, the Economist wrote, happened in Iran). The Economist argued that donating kidneys is no more risky than surrogate motherhood, which can be done legally for pay in most countries.

In Pakistan, 40 percent to 50 percent of the residents of some villages have only one kidney because they have sold the other for a transplant into a wealthy person, probably from another country, said Dr. Farhat Moazam of Pakistan, at a World Health Organization conference. Pakistani donors are offered $2,500 for a kidney but receive only about half of that because middlemen take so much. In Chennai, southern India, poor fishermen and their families sold kidneys after their livelihoods were destroyed by the Indian Ocean tsunami on 26 December 2004. About 100 people, mostly women, sold their kidneys for 40,000–60,000 rupees ($900–1,350). Thilakavathy Agatheesh, 30, who sold a kidney in May 2005 for 40,000 rupees said, "I used to earn some money selling fish but now the post-surgery stomach cramps prevent me from going to work." Most kidney sellers say that selling their kidney was a mistake.

In Cyprus in 2010 police closed a fertility clinic under charges of trafficking in human eggs. The Petra Clinic, as it was known locally, brought in women from Ukraine and Russia for egg harvesting and sold the genetic material to foreign fertility tourists. This sort of reproductive trafficking violates laws in the European Union. In 2010 Scott Carney reported for the Pulitzer Center on Crisis Reporting and the magazine Fast Company explored illicit fertility networks in Spain, the United States and Israel.

Forced donation 

There have been concerns that certain authorities are harvesting organs from people deemed undesirable, such as prison populations. The World Medical Association stated that prisoners and other individuals in custody are not in a position to give consent freely, and therefore their organs must not be used for transplantation.

According to former Chinese Deputy Minister of Health, Huang Jiefu, the practice of transplanting organs from executed prisoners is still occurring . World Journal reported Huang had admitted approximately 95% of all organs used for transplantation are from executed prisoners. The lack of a public organ donation program in China is used as a justification for this practice. In July 2006, the Kilgour-Matas report stated, "the source of 41,500 transplants for the six-year period 2000 to 2005 is unexplained" and "we believe that there has been and continues today to be large scale organ seizures from unwilling Falun Gong practitioners". Investigative journalist Ethan Gutmann estimates 65,000 Falun Gong practitioners were killed for their organs from 2000 to 2008. However 2016 reports updated the death toll of the 15-year period since the persecution of Falun Gong began putting the death toll at 150,000 to 1.5 million. In December 2006, after not getting assurances from the Chinese government about allegations relating to Chinese prisoners, the two major organ transplant hospitals in Queensland, Australia stopped transplantation training for Chinese surgeons and banned joint research programs into organ transplantation with China.

In May 2008, two United Nations Special Rapporteurs reiterated their requests for "the Chinese government to fully explain the allegation of taking vital organs from Falun Gong practitioners and the source of organs for the sudden increase in organ transplants that has been going on in China since the year 2000". People in other parts of the world are responding to this availability of organs, and a number of individuals (including US and Japanese citizens) have elected to travel to China or India as medical tourists to receive organ transplants which may have been sourced in what might be considered elsewhere to be unethical manner.

Organ transplantation by region 
Some estimates of the number of transplants performed in various regions of the world have been derived from the Global Burden of Disease Study.

According to the Council of Europe, Spain through the Spanish Transplant Organization shows the highest worldwide rate of 35.1 donors per million population in 2005 and 33.8 in 2006. In 2011, it was 35.3.

In addition to the citizens waiting for organ transplants in the US and other developed nations, there are long waiting lists in the rest of the world. More than 2 million people need organ transplants in China, 50,000 waiting in Latin America (90% of whom are waiting for kidneys), as well as thousands more in the less documented continent of Africa. Donor bases vary in developing nations.

In Latin America the donor rate is 40–100 per million per year, similar to that of developed countries.  However, in Uruguay, Cuba, and Chile, 90% of organ transplants came from cadaveric donors.  Cadaveric donors represent 35% of donors in Saudi Arabia.  There is continuous effort to increase the utilization of cadaveric donors in Asia; however, the popularity of living, single kidney donors in India yields a cadaveric donor prevalence of less than 1 per million population.

Traditionally, Muslims believe body desecration in life or death to be forbidden, and thus many reject organ transplant. However most Muslim authorities nowadays accept the practice if another life will be saved. As an example, it may be assumed in countries such as Singapore with a cosmopolitan populace that includes Muslims, a special Majlis Ugama Islam Singapura governing body is formed to look after the interests of Singapore's Muslim community over issues that includes their burial arrangements.

Organ transplantation in Singapore is generally overseen by the National Organ Transplant Unit of the Ministry of Health (Singapore). Due to a diversity in mindsets and religious viewpoints, while Muslims on this island are generally not expected to donate their organs even upon death, youth in Singapore are educated on the Human Organ Transplant Act at the age of 18, which is around the age of military conscription. The Organ Donor Registry maintains two types of information, firstly people of Singapore that donate their organs or bodies for transplantation, research or education upon their death, under the Medical (Therapy, Education and Research) Act (MTERA), and secondly people that object to the removal of kidneys, liver, heart and corneas upon death for the purpose of transplantation, under the Human Organ Transplant Act (HOTA). The Live On social awareness movement is also formed to educate Singaporeans on organ donation.

Organ transplantation in China has taken place since the 1960s, and China has one of the largest transplant programmes in the world, peaking at over 13,000 transplants a year by 2004. Organ donation, however, is against Chinese tradition and culture, and involuntary organ donation is illegal under Chinese law. China's transplant programme attracted the attention of international news media in the 1990s due to ethical concerns about the organs and tissue removed from the corpses of executed criminals being commercially traded. In 2006 it became clear that about 41,500 organs had been sourced from Falun Gong practitioners in China since 2000.

With regard to organ transplantation in Israel, there is a severe organ shortage due to religious objections by some rabbis who oppose all organ donations and others who advocate that a rabbi participate in all decision making regarding a particular donor. One-third of all heart transplants performed on Israelis are done in China; others are done in Europe. Dr. Jacob Lavee, head of the heart-transplant unit, Sheba Medical Center, Tel Aviv, believes that "transplant tourism" is unethical and Israeli insurers should not pay for it. The organization HODS (Halachic Organ Donor Society) is working to increase knowledge and participation in organ donation among Jews throughout the world.

Transplantation rates also differ based on race, sex, and income. A study done with people beginning long term dialysis showed that the sociodemographic barriers to renal transplantation present themselves even before patients are on the transplant list. For example, different groups express definite interest and complete pretransplant workup at different rates. Previous efforts to create fair transplantation policies had focused on people currently on the transplantation waiting list.

In the United States, nearly 35,000 organ transplants were done in 2017, a 3.4 percent increase over 2016. About 18 percent of these were from living donors – people who gave one kidney or a part of their liver to someone else. But 115,000 Americans remain on waiting lists for organ transplants. By September 2022, the US had reached one million organ transplants overall.

History 
Successful human allotransplants have a relatively long history of operative skills that were present long before the necessities for post-operative survival were discovered. Rejection and the side effects of preventing rejection (especially infection and nephropathy) were, are, and may always be the key problem.

Several apocryphal accounts of transplants exist well prior to the scientific understanding and advancements that would be necessary for them to have actually occurred. The Chinese physician Pien Chi'ao reportedly exchanged hearts between a man of strong spirit but weak will with one of a man of weak spirit but strong will in an attempt to achieve balance in each man. Roman Catholic accounts report the 3rd-century saints Damian and Cosmas as replacing the gangrenous or cancerous leg of the Roman deacon Justinian with the leg of a recently deceased Ethiopian. Most accounts have the saints performing the transplant in the 4th century, many decades after their deaths; some accounts have them only instructing living surgeons who performed the procedure.

The more likely accounts of early transplants deal with skin transplantation. The first reasonable account is of the Indian surgeon Sushruta in the 2nd century BC, who used autografted skin transplantation in nose reconstruction, a rhinoplasty. Success or failure of these procedures is not well documented. Centuries later, the Italian surgeon Gasparo Tagliacozzi performed successful skin autografts; he also failed consistently with allografts, offering the first suggestion of rejection centuries before that mechanism could possibly be understood. He attributed it to the "force and power of individuality" in his 1596 work De Curtorum Chirurgia per Insitionem.

The first successful corneal allograft transplant was performed in 1837 in a gazelle model; the first successful human corneal transplant, a keratoplastic operation, was performed by Eduard Zirm at Olomouc Eye Clinic, now in the Czech Republic, in 1905.

The first transplant in the modern sense – the implantation of organ tissue in order to replace an organ function – was a thyroid transplant in 1883. It was performed by the Swiss surgeon and later Nobel laureate Theodor Kocher. In the preceding decades Kocher had perfected the removal of excess thyroid tissue in cases of goiter to an extent that he was able to remove the whole organ without the person dying from the operation. Kocher carried out the total removal of the organ in some cases as a measure to prevent recurrent goiter. By 1883, the surgeon noticed that the complete removal of the organ leads to a complex of particular symptoms that we today have learned to associate with a lack of thyroid hormone. Kocher reversed these symptoms by implanting thyroid tissue to these people and thus performed the first organ transplant. In the following years Kocher and other surgeons used thyroid transplantation also to treat thyroid deficiency that appeared spontaneously, without a preceding organ removal.

Thyroid transplantation became the model for a whole new therapeutic strategy: organ transplantation. After the example of the thyroid, other organs were transplanted in the decades around 1900. Some of these transplants were done in animals for purposes of research, where organ removal and transplantation became a successful strategy of investigating the function of organs. Kocher was awarded his Nobel Prize in 1909 for the discovery of the function of the thyroid gland. At the same time, organs were also transplanted for treating diseases in humans. The thyroid gland became the model for transplants of adrenal and parathyroid glands, pancreas, ovary, testicles and kidney. By 1900, the idea that one can successfully treat internal diseases by replacing a failed organ through transplantation had been generally accepted. Pioneering work in the surgical technique of transplantation was made in the early 1900s by the French surgeon Alexis Carrel, with Charles Guthrie, with the transplantation of arteries or veins. Their skillful anastomosis operations and the new suturing techniques laid the groundwork for later transplant surgery and won Carrel the 1912 Nobel Prize in Physiology or Medicine. From 1902, Carrel performed transplant experiments on dogs. Surgically successful in moving kidneys, hearts, and spleens, he was one of the first to identify the problem of rejection, which remained insurmountable for decades. The discovery of transplant immunity by the German surgeon Georg Schöne, various strategies of matching donor and recipient, and the use of different agents for immune suppression did not result in substantial improvement so that organ transplantation was largely abandoned after WWI.

In 1954, the first ever successful transplant of any organ was done at the Brigham & Women's Hospital in Boston, Ma. The surgery was performed by Dr. Joseph Murray, who received the Nobel Prize in Medicine for his work. The success of this transplant was mostly due to the family relation between the recipient, a Richard Herrick of Maine, and his donor and identical twin brother Ronald. Richard Herrick was in the Navy and became severely ill with acute renal failure. His brother Ronald donated his kidney to Richard, and Richard lived on for another eight years. Prior to this case, transplant recipients did not survive for more than thirty days. Their close family relation meant there was no need for anti-rejection medications, which was not known until this time, so the case shed light on the cause of rejection and of possible anti-rejection medicine.

Major steps in skin transplantation occurred during the First World War, notably in the work of Harold Gillies at Aldershot. Among his advances was the tubed pedicle graft, which maintained a flesh connection from the donor site until the graft established its own blood flow. Gillies' assistant, Archibald McIndoe, carried on the work into the Second World War as reconstructive surgery. In 1962, the first successful replantation surgery was performed – re-attaching a severed limb and restoring (limited) function and feeling.

Transplant of a single gonad (testis) from a living donor was carried out in early July 1926 in Zaječar, Serbia, by a Russian émigré surgeon Dr. Peter Vasil'evič Kolesnikov. The donor was a convicted murderer, one Ilija Krajan, whose death sentence was commuted to 20 years imprisonment, and he was led to believe that it was done because he had donated his testis to an elderly medical doctor. Both the donor and the receiver survived, but charges were brought in a court of law by the public prosecutor against Dr. Kolesnikov, not for performing the operation, but for lying to the donor.

The first attempted human deceased-donor transplant was performed by the Ukrainian surgeon Yurii Voronoy in the 1930s; but failed due to ischemia. Joseph Murray and J. Hartwell Harrison performed the first successful transplant, a kidney transplant between identical twins, in 1954, because no immunosuppression was necessary for genetically identical individuals.

In the late 1940s Peter Medawar, working for the National Institute for Medical Research, improved the understanding of rejection. Identifying the immune reactions in 1951, Medawar suggested that immunosuppressive drugs could be used. Cortisone had been recently discovered and the more effective azathioprine was identified in 1959, but it was not until the discovery of cyclosporine in 1970 that transplant surgery found a sufficiently powerful immunosuppressive.

There was a successful deceased-donor lung transplant into an emphysema and lung cancer patient in June 1963 by James Hardy at the University of Mississippi Medical Center in Jackson, Mississippi. The patient John Russell survived for eighteen days before dying of kidney failure.

Thomas Starzl of Denver attempted a liver transplant in the same year, but he was not successful until 1967.

In the early 1960s and prior to long-term dialysis becoming available, Keith Reemtsma and his colleagues at Tulane University in New Orleans attempted transplants of chimpanzee kidneys into 13 human patients.  Most of these patients only lived one to two months.  However, in 1964, a 23-year-old woman lived for nine months and even returned to her job as a school teacher until she suddenly collapsed and died.  It was assumed that she died from an acute electrolyte disturbance.  At autopsy, the kidneys had not been rejected nor was there any other obvious cause of death. One source states this patient died from pneumonia. Tom Starzl and his team in Colorado used baboon kidneys with six human patients who lived one or two months, but with no longer term survivors. Others in the United States and France had limited experiences.

The heart was a major prize for transplant surgeons. But over and above rejection issues, the heart deteriorates within minutes of death, so any operation would have to be performed at great speed. The development of the heart-lung machine was also needed. Lung pioneer James Hardy was prepared to attempt a human heart transplant in 1964, but when a premature failure of comatose Boyd Rush's heart caught Hardy with no human donor, he used a chimpanzee heart, which beat in his patient's chest for approximately one hour and then failed. The first partial success was achieved on 3 December 1967, when Christiaan Barnard of Cape Town, South Africa, performed the world's first human-to-human heart transplant with patient Louis Washkansky as the recipient.  Washkansky survived for eighteen days amid what many saw as a distasteful publicity circus. The media interest prompted a spate of heart transplants. Over a hundred were performed in 1968–1969, but almost all the people died within 60 days. Barnard's second patient, Philip Blaiberg, lived for 19 months.

It was the advent of cyclosporine that altered transplants from research surgery to life-saving treatment. In 1968 surgical pioneer Denton Cooley performed 17 transplants, including the first heart-lung transplant. Fourteen of his patients were dead within six months. By 1984 two-thirds of all heart transplant patients survived for five years or more. With organ transplants becoming commonplace, limited only by donors, surgeons moved on to riskier fields, including multiple-organ transplants on humans and whole-body transplant research on animals. On 9 March 1981, the first successful heart-lung transplant took place at Stanford University Hospital. The head surgeon, Bruce Reitz, credited the patient's recovery to cyclosporine.

As the rising success rate of transplants and modern immunosuppression make transplants more common, the need for more organs has become critical. Transplants from living donors, especially relatives, have become increasingly common. Additionally, there is substantive research into xenotransplantation, or transgenic organs; although these forms of transplant are not yet being used in humans, clinical trials involving the use of specific cell types have been conducted with promising results, such as using porcine islets of Langerhans to treat type 1 diabetes. However, there are still many problems that would need to be solved before they would be feasible options in people requiring transplants.

Recently, researchers have been looking into means of reducing the general burden of immunosuppression. Common approaches include avoidance of steroids, reduced exposure to calcineurin inhibitors, and other means of weaning drugs based on patient outcome and function. While short-term outcomes appear promising, long-term outcomes are still unknown, and in general, reduced immunosuppression increases the risk of rejection and decreases the risk of infection. The risk of early rejection is increased if corticosteroid immunosuppression are avoided or withdrawn after renal transplantation.

Many other new drugs are under development for transplantation.
The emerging field of regenerative medicine promises to solve the problem of organ transplant rejection by regrowing organs in the lab, using person's own cells (stem cells or healthy cells extracted from the donor site).

Timeline of transplants 
 1869: First skin autograft-transplantation by Carl Bunger, who documented the first modern successful skin graft on a person. Bunger repaired a person's nose destroyed by syphilis by grafting flesh from the inner thigh to the nose, in a method reminiscent of the Sushrutha.
 1905: First successful cornea transplant by Eduard Zirm (Czech Republic)
 1908: First skin allograft-transplantation of skin from a donor to a recipient (Switzerland)
 1931: First uterus transplantation (Lili Elbe).
 1950: First successful kidney transplant by Dr. Richard H. Lawler (Chicago, US)
 1954: First living related kidney transplant (identical twins) (US)
 1954: Brazil's first successful corneal transplant, the first liver (Brazil)
 1955: First heart valve allograft into descending aorta (Canada)
 1963: First successful lung transplant by James D. Hardy with patient living 18 days (US)
 1964: James D. Hardy attempts heart transplant using chimpanzee heart (US)
 1964: Human patient lived nine months with chimpanzee kidneys, twelve other human patients only lived one to two months, Keith Reemtsma and team (New Orleans, US)
 1965: Spain's first successful kidney transplant at Hospital Clinic de Barcelona, Catalonia, Spain, by a surgeon team lead by Josep Maria Gil-Vernet and Antoni Caralps. The patient, a woman, had a very long life since the procedure.
 1965: Australia's first successful (living) kidney transplant (Queen Elizabeth Hospital, SA, Australia)
 1966: First successful pancreas transplant by Richard C. Lillehei and William Kelly (Minnesota, US)
 1967: First successful liver transplant by Thomas Starzl (Denver, US)
 1967: First successful heart transplant by Christian Barnard (Cape Town, South Africa)
 1978 Use of ciclosporin in clinical renal transplants 
 1981 Use of monoclonal antibodies to lymphocytes in organ grafting
 1981: First successful heart/lung transplant by Bruce Reitz (Stanford, US)
 1983: First successful lung lobe transplant by Joel Cooper at the Toronto General Hospital (Toronto, Canada)
 1984: First successful double organ transplant by Thomas Starzl and Henry T. Bahnson (Pittsburgh, US)
 1986: First successful double-lung transplant (Ann Harrison) by Joel Cooper at the Toronto General Hospital (Toronto, Canada)
 1990: First successful adult segmental living-related liver transplant by Mehmet Haberal (Ankara, Turkey)
 1992: First successful combined liver-kidney transplantation from a living-related donor by Mehmet Haberal (Ankara, Turkey)
 1995: First successful laparoscopic live-donor nephrectomy by Lloyd Ratner and Louis Kavoussi (Baltimore, US)
 1997: First successful allogeneic vascularized transplantation of a fresh and perfused human knee joint by Gunther O. Hofmann
 1997: Illinois' first living donor kidney-pancreas transplant and first robotic living donor pancreatectomy in the US. University of Illinois Medical Center
 1998: First successful live-donor partial pancreas transplant by David Sutherland (Minnesota, US)
 1998: First successful hand transplant by Dr. Jean-Michel Dubernard (Lyon, France)
 1998: United States' first adult-to-adult living donor liver transplant University of Illinois Medical Center
 1999: First successful tissue engineered bladder transplanted by Anthony Atala (Boston Children's Hospital, US)
 2000: First robotic donor nephrectomy for a living-donor kidney transplant in the world University of Illinois Medical Center
 2004: First liver and small bowel transplants from same living donor into same recipient in the world University of Illinois Medical Center
 2005: First successful ovarian transplant by Dr. P. N. Mhatre (Wadia Hospital, Mumbai, India)
 2005: First successful partial face transplant (France)
 2005: First robotic hepatectomy in the United States University of Illinois Medical Center
 2006: Illinois' first paired donation for ABO incompatible kidney transplant University of Illinois Medical Center
 2006: First jaw transplant to combine donor jaw with bone marrow from the patient, by Eric M. Genden (Mount Sinai Hospital, New York City, US)
 2006: First successful human penis transplant (later reversed after 15 days due to 44-year-old recipient's wife's psychological rejection) (Guangzhou, China)
 2008: First successful complete full double arm transplant by Edgar Biemer, Christoph Höhnke and Manfred Stangl (Technical University of Munich, Germany)
 2008: First baby born from transplanted ovary. The transplant was carried out by Dr Sherman Silber at the Infertility Centre of St Louis in Missouri. The donor is her twin sister.
 2008: First transplant of a human windpipe using a patient's own stem cells, by Paolo Macchiarini (Barcelona, Spain)
 2008: First successful transplantation of near total area (80%) of face, (including palate, nose, cheeks, and eyelid) by Maria Siemionow (Cleveland Clinic, US)
 2009: Worlds' first robotic kidney transplant in an obese patient University of Illinois Medical Center
 2010: First full facial transplant by Dr. Joan Pere Barret and team (Hospital Universitari Vall d'Hebron on 26 July 2010, in Barcelona, Spain)
 2011: First double leg transplant by Dr. Cavadas and team (Valencia's Hospital, La Fe, Spain)
 2012: First simultaneous robotic bariatric surgery (sleeve gastrectomy) and kidney transplantation (university of Illinois at Chicago).  (1).  (2)
 2012: First Robotic Alloparathyroid transplant. University of Illinois Chicago
 2013: First successful entire face transplantation as an urgent life-saving surgery at Maria Skłodowska-Curie Institute of Oncology branch in Gliwice, Poland.
 2014: First successful uterine transplant resulting in live birth (Sweden)
 2014: First successful penis transplant. (South Africa)
 2014: First neonatal organ transplant. (UK)
 2018: Skin gun invented, which takes a small amount of healthy skin to be grown in a lab, then is sprayed onto burnt skin. This way skin will heal in days instead of months and will not scar.
 2019: First drone delivery of a donated kidney, that was then successfully transplanted into a patient. (US)
 2021: First transplant of both arms and shoulders performed on an Icelandic patient at the Édouard Herriot Hospital. (FR)
 2022: First successful heart transplant from a pig to a human patient. (US) The recipient later died as the pig's heart was infected with porcine cytomegalovirus.

Society and culture

Success rates 

Since 2000, there have been approximately 2,200 lung transplants performed each year worldwide.  From 2000 to 2006, the median survival period for lung transplant patients has been 5.5 years.

Comparative costs 

In China, a kidney transplant operation runs for around $70,000, liver for $160,000, and heart for $120,000.

Safety 
In the United States, tissue transplants are regulated by the US Food and Drug Administration (FDA) which sets strict regulations on the safety of the transplants, primarily aimed at the prevention of the spread of communicable disease. Regulations include criteria for donor screening and testing as well as strict regulations on the processing and distribution of tissue grafts. Organ transplants are not regulated by the FDA. It is essential that the HLA complexes of both the donor and recipient be as closely matched as possible to prevent graft rejection.

In November 2007, the CDC reported the first-ever case of HIV and Hepatitis C being simultaneously transferred through an organ transplant. The donor was a 38-year-old male, considered "high-risk" by donation organizations, and his organs transmitted HIV and Hepatitis C to four organ recipients. Experts say that the reason the diseases did not show up on screening tests is probably because they were contracted within three weeks before the donor's death, so antibodies would not have existed in high enough numbers to detect. The crisis has caused many to call for more sensitive screening tests, which could pick up antibodies sooner. Currently, the screens cannot pick up on the small number of antibodies produced in HIV infections within the last 90 days or Hepatitis C infections within the last 18–21 days before a donation is made.

Nucleic acid testing is now being done by many organ procurement organizations and is able to detect HIV and hepatitis C directly within seven to ten days of exposure to the virus.

Transplant laws 
Both developing and developed countries have forged various policies to try to increase the safety and availability of organ transplants to their citizens. However, whilst potential recipients in developing countries may mirror their more developed counterparts in desperation, potential donors in developing countries do not. The Indian government has had difficulty tracking the flourishing organ black market in their country, but in recent times it has amended its organ transplant law to make punishment more stringent for commercial dealings in organs. It has also included new clauses in the law to support deceased organ donation, such as making it mandatory to request for organ donation in case of brain death. Other countries victimized by illegal organ trade have also implemented legislative reactions.  Moldova has made international adoption illegal in fear of organ traffickers. China has made selling of organs illegal as of July 2006 and claims that all prisoner organ donors have filed consent. However, doctors in other countries, such as the United Kingdom, have accused China of abusing its high capital punishment rate. Despite these efforts, illegal organ trafficking continues to thrive and can be attributed to corruption in healthcare systems, which has been traced as high up as the doctors themselves in China and Ukraine, and the blind eye economically strained governments and health care programs must sometimes turn to organ trafficking. Some organs are also shipped to Uganda and the Netherlands. This was a main product in the triangular trade in 1934.

Starting on 1 May 2007, doctors involved in commercial trade of organs will face fines and suspensions in China. Only a few certified hospitals will be allowed to perform organ transplants in order to curb illegal transplants. Harvesting organs without donor's consent was also deemed a crime.

On 27 June 2008, Indonesian, Sulaiman Damanik, 26, pleaded guilty in Singapore court for sale of his kidney to CK Tang's executive chair, Tang Wee Sung, 55, for 150 million rupiah (S$22,200). The Transplant Ethics Committee must approve living donor kidney transplants. Organ trading is banned in Singapore and in many other countries to prevent the exploitation of "poor and socially disadvantaged donors who are unable to make informed choices and suffer potential medical risks." Toni, 27, the other accused, donated a kidney to an Indonesian patient in March, alleging he was the patient's adopted son, and was paid 186 million rupiah (US$20,200). Upon sentence, both would suffer each, 12 months in jail or 10,000 Singapore dollars (US$7,600) fine.

In an article appearing in the April 2004 issue of Econ Journal Watch, economist Alex Tabarrok examined the impact of direct consent laws on transplant organ availability. Tabarrok found that social pressures resisting the use of transplant organs decreased over time as the opportunity of individual decisions increased. Tabarrok concluded his study suggesting that gradual elimination of organ donation restrictions and move to a free market in organ sales will increase supply of organs and encourage broader social acceptance of organ donation as a practice.

In the United States 24 states have no law preventing discrimination against potential organ recipients based on cognitive ability, including children. A 2008 study found that of the transplant centers surveyed in those states 85 percent considered disability when deciding transplant list and forty four percent would deny an organ transplant to a child with a neurodevelopmental disability.

Ethical concerns 

The existence and distribution of organ transplantation procedures in developing countries, while almost always beneficial to those receiving them, raise many ethical concerns. Both the source and method of obtaining the organ to transplant are major ethical issues to consider, as well as the notion of distributive justice. The World Health Organization argues that transplantations promote health, but the notion of "transplantation tourism" has the potential to violate human rights or exploit the poor, to have unintended health consequences, and to provide unequal access to services, all of which ultimately may cause harm. Regardless of the "gift of life", in the context of developing countries, this might be coercive. The practice of coercion could be considered exploitative of the poor population, violating basic human rights according to Articles 3 and 4 of the Universal Declaration of Human Rights. There is also a powerful opposing view, that trade in organs, if properly and effectively regulated to ensure that the seller is fully informed of all the consequences of donation, is a mutually beneficial transaction between two consenting adults, and that prohibiting it would itself be a violation of Articles 3 and 29 of the Universal Declaration of Human Rights.

Even within developed countries there is concern that enthusiasm for increasing the supply of organs may trample on respect for the right to life. The question is made even more complicated by the fact that the "irreversibility" criterion for legal death cannot be adequately defined and can easily change with changing technology.

Artificial organ transplantation 
Surgeons, notably Paolo Macchiarini, in Sweden performed the first implantation of a synthetic trachea in July 2011, for a 36-year-old patient who had cancer. Stem cells taken from the patient's hip were treated with growth factors and incubated on a plastic replica of his natural trachea.

According to information uncovered by the Swedish documentary "Dokument Inifrån: Experimenten" (Swedish: "Documents from the Inside: The Experiments") the patient, Andemariam went on to develop an increasingly terrible and eventually bloody cough to dying, incubated, in the hospital. At that point, determined by autopsy, 90% of the synthetic windpipe had come loose. He allegedly made several trips to see Macchiarini for his complications, and at one point had surgery again to have his synthetic windpipe replaced, but Macchiarini was notoriously difficult to get an appointment with. According to the autopsy, the old synthetic windpipe did not appear to have been replaced.

Macchiarini's academic credentials have been called into question and he has recently been accused of alleged research misconduct.

Left ventricular assist devices are often used as a "bridge" to provide additional time while a patient waits for a transplant.  For example, former US vice-president Dick Cheney had such a device implanted in 2010 and then 20 months later received a heart transplant in 2012.  In year 2012, about 3,000 ventricular assist devices were inserted in the United States, as compared to approximately 2,500 heart transplants. The use of airbags in cars as well as greater use of helmets by bicyclists and skiers has reduced the number of persons with fatal head injuries, which is a common source of donors hearts.

Research

An early-stage medical laboratory and research company, called Organovo, designs and develops functional, three dimensional human tissue for medical research and therapeutic applications. The company utilizes its NovoGen MMX Bioprinter for 3D bioprinting. Organovo anticipates that the bioprinting of human tissues will accelerate the preclinical drug testing and discovery process, enabling treatments to be created more quickly and at lower cost. Additionally, Organovo has long-term expectations that this technology could be suitable for surgical therapy and transplantation.

A further area of active research is concerned with improving and assessing organs during their preservation. Various techniques have emerged which show great promise, most of which involve perfusing the organ under either hypothermic (4–10 °C) or normothermic (37 °C) conditions. All of these add additional cost and logistical complexity to the organ retrieval, preservation and transplant process, but early results suggest it may well be worth it. Hypothermic perfusion is in clinical use for transplantation of kidneys and liver whilst normothermic perfusion has been used effectively in the heart, lung, liver and, less so, in the kidney.

Another area of research being explored is the use of genetically engineered animals for transplants. Similar to human organ donors, scientists have developed a genetically engineered pig with the aim of reducing rejection to pig organs by human patients. This is currently at the basic research stage, but shows great promise in alleviating the long waiting lists for organ transplants and the number of people in need of transplants outweighs the amount of organs donated. Trials are being done to prevent the pig organ transplant to enter a clinical trial phase until the potential disease transfer from pigs to humans can be safely and satisfactorily managed (Isola & Gordon, 1991).

See also 
 Artificial organ
 Beating heart cadaver
 Blood transfusion
 Laboratory-grown organ
 Organ donation
 Regenerative medicine
 Transplant rejection
 Xenotransplantation

References 

 Isola, L. M., & Gordon, J. W. (1991). Transgenic animals: a new era in developmental biology and medicine. Biotechnology (Reading, Mass.), 16, 3–20.

Further reading

External links 

 Organ Transplant survival rates from the Scientific Registry of Transplant Recipients
 
 "Overcoming the Rejection Factor: MUSC's First Organ Transplant" online exhibit at Waring Historical Library